The United World College in Mostar (UWC Mostar) (Bosnian/Croatian/Serbian Latin: Koledž Ujedinjenog svijeta u Mostaru) is a part of the United World College, founded by Elisatheth Rehn (UN Special Rapporteur on the Secretary General for the United Nations Mission in Bosnia-Herzegovina 1995-1999) and Lamija Tanović (Chair, Humanity in Action Bosnia and Herzegovina) in 2006 and officially opened by Queen Noor of Jordan. UWC Mostar is the first UWC with an explicit aim to contribute to the reconstruction of a post-conflict society and also the first to be housed within an existing public school (see also Education in Bosnia and Herzegovina).
UWC Mostar is the twelfth college in the United World Colleges family and the fourth college in Europe.

UWC Mostar was founded (key founding members Elisabeth Rehn and Lamija Tanović) as a joint initiative of UWC and the  International Baccalaureate Organization with the aim to support the peace process in the country and the region. From January 2011, UWC Mostar is part of Foundation Education in Action which is a legal successor of UWC-IB Initiative in Bosnia and Herzegovina.

Chair of the Governing Board is Pilvi Torsti, Chair of the College Board is Jasminka Bratić (who is also a member of the school's Governing Board).

UWC Mostar (165-200 students) shares the building with Gimnazija Mostar (approx. 650 students). Before the war this school, also known as the Old Gymnasium, built in 1898 - 1902 during the Austro-Hungarian rule in Bosnia and Herzegovina, was one of the finest schools in ex-Yugoslavia.  However, as consequence of the Bosnian War, nowadays Gymnasium Mostar teaches two national separate secondary school curricula, intended for Croat and Bosniak students. 
UWC Mostar students come from all ethnic groups in Bosnia and Herzegovina as well as from the region and abroad.  All students live, study and serve the community together creating a unique example of integrated education in post-war Bosnia and Herzegovina.

The college also serves as the Centre for Professional Development of Teachers in Bosnia and Herzegovina who receive training in international educational standards.

Location

The UWC Mostar is located in Mostar, which is the centre of Herzegovina, an historic region of Bosnia and Herzegovina. Mostar is widely known by the famous Old Bridge (Stari Most), originally built in 1566, destroyed by HVO forces during the Bosnian War in 1993 and rebuilt in 2004.  Mostar was chosen for hosting UWC as the most striking example of the post-war ethnic division and tensions.

Premises

The UWC Mostar is located in the city center. 

Unlike most other UWCs, UWC Mostar does not have an isolated campus - students live in three residences in different parts of the City of Mostar.

IB DP curriculum

UWC Mostar is an IB World School since September 2006. It offers International Baccalaureate Diploma Programme (IB DP) in English.
In the school year 2017/2018 UWC Mostar runs these IB Courses:

 IB Group 1 Language A1: Bosnian A1, Croatian A1, Serbian A1, English A1 - Literature, English A1 - Language and literature, German A1; other languages may be taken as "self-taught" subjects.
 IB Group 2 Second Language: English B, French Ab Initio, German B, Spanish B, Spanish Ab Initio. 
 IB Group 3 : Economics, History, Psychology, Anthropology, Global Politics, and the interdisciplinary course Environmental Systems and Societies.
 IB Group 4 Sciences: Biology, Chemistry, Physics, and ESS.
 IB Group 5 Mathematics: Mathematical Studies (in one or two years), Mathematics Standard Level, Mathematics Higher Level, Further Mathematics
 IB Group 6 Arts: Visual Arts, Theatre Arts.

Creativity, Action, Service- CAS Programme

Creativities: Model United Nations, Astronomy, School Band, Debating Club, International Cooking, UWC Links Group, AB initio languages, Community Theatre, Visual Arts, Choir, Craft, Robotics, Global Awareness, Mediation, Fashion, School Promotion Group, Improvisational Theatre

Actions: Volleyball, Basketball, Table Tennis, Football, Rugby, Hiking & Cycling, Modern Dance, Ballroom Dance, Yoga, Judo & Taek Won Do,

(Social) Services: Kindergarten Radobolja, SOS Kindergarten and Family Centre, Home for children without parental care "Egyptian Village", Centre for people with special needs "Los Rosales", Caritas’ Centre for children with Special Needs "Holy Family", Primary School for Children with Special Needs,  Refugee camp Tasovčić, Ecology Group, UWC Mostar Labs and Library maintenance, IT lab lessons, Mostar Peer Support (MOPS), UWC Mostar Green House, Parent’s Association of children with Special needs "Sunce", Amnesty International Group, Fun with Elderly

Student body

In academic year 2022/2023 the College is attended by 204 students from 72 countries of the world.

Head teachers

 2006–2010: Paul Regan
 2010–2018: Valentina Mindoljević
 2018–2019: Mark Feltham
 2019–2021: Dženan Hakalović (Acting Head)
 2021–present: Sonia Rawat

References

External links 
 Official United World College in Mostar website
 United World College in Mostar
 Скрбич М. Мир под одной крышей. Skrbic M. The World Under One Roof // Transitions Online. 28 February 2007.
 Queen Noor marks the Official Opening of UWC in Mostar // The   Royal Family of Jordan. 4 July 2007.
 Дзяўчына з Гомельшчыны пачала вучыцца ў Босніі і Герцагавіне // Гомельская праўда. 2007-09-08. С. 9. Be
 „Weltschule“ in Mostar. "World College" in Mostar. // WienInternational.at. 2007-11-08.
 UWC Graduation Ceremony in Mostar // OneWorld Southeast Europe.

Universities and colleges in Mostar
United World Colleges
International Baccalaureate schools in Bosnia and Herzegovina